Pinnacle Plaza (荣祥广场) is a shopping complex located in the Shunyi District of Beijing, China. It is located nearby to several housing complexes including River Garden, Yosemite, Capital Paradise and Eurovilla.It houses several restaurants including a Burger King, Starbucks and Dominoes Pizza.
It is also located close to the International School of Beijing and the British School of Beijing, which follows the British curriculum and is one of the most international schools in Beijing. Pinnacle Plaza is a Place where the expats living in Beijing usually are because of the foreign supermarket and proximity to housing complexes near Pinnacle Plaza.

External links
 https://www.thebeijinger.com/directory/pinnacle-plaza

Shopping malls in Beijing
Shunyi District